Karimabad (also Romanized as Karīmābād; also known as Sheykh Karīm) is a village in Sadan Rostaq-e Gharbi Rural District, in the Central District of Kordkuy County, Golestan Province, Iran. At the 2006 census, its population was 73, in 20 families.

References 

Populated places in Kordkuy County